The 2011 Grand Prix de Denain was the 53rd edition of the Grand Prix de Denain cycle race and was held on 14 April 2011. The race started and finished in Denain. The race was won by Jimmy Casper.

General classification

References

2011
2011 in road cycling
2011 in French sport